Tetroxoprim (INN) is a derivative of trimethoprim. It was first described in 1979.

Its chemical formula is C=16 | H=22 | N=4 | O=4.

References

Bacterial dihydrofolate reductase inhibitors
Aminopyrimidines
Phenol ethers